Andra Day is an American singer, songwriter, and actress.

Her debut studio album, Cheers to the Fall, was released in 2015 and it received a nomination for Best R&B Album at the 58th Annual Grammy Awards, while the single "Rise Up" was nominated for Best R&B Performance. For her live rendition of "Rise Up" on the talk show The View, Day was nominated for a Daytime Emmy Award.

In 2021, Day portrayed American jazz singer Billie Holiday in the biopic The United States vs. Billie Holiday, her feature film debut. Her performance won her the Golden Globe Award for Best Actress in a Motion Picture – Drama, making her the second African American actress to win in this category after Whoopi Goldberg in 1987. At the 93rd Academy Awards, she was nominated for Best Actress. The soundtrack of the film won Day her first Grammy Award, in the category of Best Compilation Soundtrack for Visual Media.

Major associations

Academy Awards

Children's and Family Emmy Awards

Daytime Emmy Awards

Golden Globe Awards

Grammy Awards

Miscellaneous awards

BET Awards

Billboard Women in Music

Black Reel Awards

CMT Music Awards

Hollywood Film Awards

NAACP Image Awards

Soul Train Music Awards

Critics awards

Critics' Choice Movie Awards

Dallas–Fort Worth Film Critics Association

References

External links

Lists of awards received by American actor
Lists of awards received by American musician